Asplöven HC is an ice hockey club from Haparanda, Sweden, playing in Sweden's third tier league Hockeyettan. They play their home games at the Arena Polarica, which seats 1500 spectators.

History
Asplöven HC were founded on 14 April 1972. Asplöven were promoted to HockeyAllsvenskan for the 2012–13 season, after Borås HC was relegated due to that club's financial troubles.

Season-by-season

References

External links
 asploven.com — Official website

Ice hockey teams in Sweden
Ice hockey teams in Norrbotten County
Ice hockey clubs established in 1972
1972 establishments in Sweden